A pet peeve is a minor annoyance that can instill great frustration in an individual.

Pet Peeve may also refer to:

 Pet Peeve (1954 film), a 1954 Tom and Jerry cartoon
 Pet Peeve (novel), the twenty-ninth book of the Xanth series